Lipton is a surname, and may refer to:
 
 Bruce Lipton (born 1944), American developmental biologist
 Carwood Lipton (1920–2001), US Army officer and World War II veteran portrayed in Band of Brothers (TV miniseries)
 Celia Lipton (1923–2011), British actress, singer and philanthropist
 Ellen Lipton (born 1967), American lawyer and politician
 Eric Lipton (contemporary), New York Times reporter
 James Lipton (1926–2020), American writer and poet
 John Lipton (born 1936), American politician
 Lawrence Lipton (1898–1975), American journalist, writer, and beat poet
 Lenny Lipton (born 1940), American author, filmmaker and stereoscopic vision system inventor
 Lew Lipton (1897–1961), American screenwriter
 Lynne Lipton (contemporary), American actress
 Marcus Lipton (1900–1978), British Labour Party politician
 Martha Lipton (1913–2006), American operatic mezzo-soprano
 Martin Lipton (born 1931), American lawyer
 Michael Lipton (born 1937), British economist
 Peggy Lipton (1946–2019), American actress, model, and socialite
 Peter Lipton (1954–2007), American philosopher of science and epistemologist
 Richard J. Lipton (born 1946), American computer scientist
 Seymour Lipton (1903–1986), American abstract expressionist sculptor
 Sydney Lipton (1905–1995), English bandleader
 Sir Thomas Lipton (1848–1931), British  merchant and yachtsman; created the Lipton tea brand
 Zachary Lipton (born 1985), American jazz saxophonist, composer, and bandleader

See also
 Lipton, tea brand, and former British supermarket chain
 Lipton, Saskatchewan, village in Canada
 Lipson (disambiguation)